In mathematics, the Chung–Fuchs theorem, named after Chung Kai-lai and Wolfgang Heinrich Johannes Fuchs, states that for a particle undergoing a random walk in m-dimensions, it is certain to come back infinitely often to any neighborhood of the origin on a one-dimensional line (m = 1) or two-dimensional plane (m = 2), but in three or more dimensional spaces it will leave to infinity.

Specifically, if a position of the particle is described by the vector :

where  are independent m-dimensional vectors with a given multivariate distribution,

the following holds:

References
.
 "On the distribution of values of sums of random variables" Chung, K.L. and Fuchs, W.H.J. Mem. Amer. Math. Soc. 1951 no.6, 12pp

Physics theorems